Kongo or Kikongo is one of the Bantu languages spoken by the Kongo people living in the Democratic Republic of the Congo, the Republic of the Congo, Gabon and Angola. It is a tonal language. It was spoken by many of those who were taken from the region and sold as slaves in the Americas. For this reason, while Kongo still is spoken in the above-mentioned countries, creolized forms of the language are found in ritual speech of Afro-American religions, especially in Brazil, Cuba, Puerto Rico, the Dominican Republic and Haiti. It is also one of the sources of the Gullah language and the Palenquero creole in Colombia. The vast majority of present-day speakers live in Africa. There are roughly seven million native speakers of Kongo, with perhaps two million more who use it as a second language.

Geographic distribution
Kongo was the language of the Kingdom of Kongo prior to the creation of Angola by the Portuguese Crown in 1575 and the Berlin Conference (1884-1885) that balkanized the rest of the kingdom into three territories, which are now parts of the DRC (Kongo Central and Bandundu), the Republic of the Congo and Gabon.

Kikongo is the base for the Creole language Kituba, also called Kikongo de l'État and Kikongo ya Leta (French and Kituba respectively for "Kikongo of the state administration" or "Kikongo of the State"). The constitution of the Republic of the Congo uses the name Kituba, and the one of the Democratic Republic of the Congo uses the term Kikongo, while Kituba (i.e. Kikongo ya Leta) is used in the administration. This can be explained by the fact that Kikongo ya Leta is often mistakenly called Kikongo (i.e. KiNtandu, KiManianga, KiNdibu, etc.). 

Kikongo and Kituba are spoken in:
 South of Republic of the Congo :
 Kikongo (Yombe, Vili, Ladi, Nsundi, etc.) and Kituba :
 Kouilou,
 Niari,
 Bouenza,
 Lékoumou,
 south of Brazzaville,
 Pointe-Noire,
 Kikongo (Ladi, Kongo Boko, etc.) :
 Pool;
 South-west of Democratic Republic of the Congo :
 Kikongo (Yombe, Ntandu, Ndibu, Manyanga, etc.) and Kikongo ya Leta :
 Kongo Central,
 a part of Kinshasa,
 Kikongo ya Leta :
 Kwilu,
 Kwango,
 Mai-Ndombe,
 far west Kasaï ;
 North of Angola :
 Kikongo (Kisikongo, Zombo, Ibinda, etc.) :
 Cabinda,
 Uíge,
 Zaire,
 north of Bengo and north of Cuanza Norte; 
 South-West of Gabon.
 Kikongo (Vili) :
 Nyanga,
 Ngounié

Presence in the Americas 
Many African slaves transported in the Atlantic slave trade spoke Kikongo, and its influence can be seen in many creole languages in the diaspora, such as:
Brazil
Cupópia
Salto de Pirapora
Colombia
Palenquero
San Basilio de Palenque
Cuba
Habla Congo/Habla Bantu
None; liturgical language of the Afro-Cuban Palo religion.
Haiti
Haitian Creole
Haiti
Bahamas
Cuba
Dominican Republic
United States
Langaj
None; liturgical language of the Haitian Vodou religion.
Suriname
Saramaccan language
Boven Suriname
Brokopondo
Paramaribo
French Guiana
Netherlands

People 
Prior to the Berlin Conference, the people called themselves "Bisi Kongo" (plural) and "Mwisi Kongo" (singular); currently, they call themselves "Bakongo" (pl.) and "Mukongo" (sing.).

Writing 

At present there is no standard orthography of Kikongo, with a variety in use in written literature, mostly newspapers, pamphlets and a few books.

Kongo was the earliest Bantu language which was committed to writing in Latin characters and had the earliest dictionary of any Bantu language. A catechism was produced under the authority of Diogo Gomes, a Jesuit born in Kongo of Portuguese parents in 1557, but no version of it exists today.

In 1624, Mateus Cardoso, another Portuguese Jesuit, edited and published a Kongo translation of the Portuguese catechism of Marcos Jorge. The preface informs us that the translation was done by Kongo teachers from São Salvador (modern Mbanza Kongo) and was probably partially the work of Félix do Espírito Santo (also a Kongo).

The dictionary was written in about 1648 for the use of Capuchin missionaries and the principal author was Manuel Robredo, a secular priest from Kongo (who became a Capuchin as Francisco de São Salvador). In the back of this dictionary is found a sermon of two pages written only in Kongo. The dictionary has some 10,000 words.

Additional dictionaries were created by French missionaries to the Loango coast in the 1780s, and a word list was published by Bernardo da Canecattim in 1805.

Baptist missionaries who arrived in Kongo in 1879 developed a modern orthography of the language.

W. Holman Bentley's Dictionary and Grammar of the Kongo Language was published in 1887. In the preface, Bentley gave credit to Nlemvo, an African, for his assistance, and described "the methods he used to compile the dictionary, which included sorting and correcting 25,000 slips of paper containing words and their definitions." Eventually W. Holman Bentley with the special assistance of João Lemvo produced a complete Christian Bible in 1905.

The Office of the High Commissioner for Human Rights has published a translation of Universal Declaration of Human Rights in Fiote.

Linguistic classification
Kikongo belongs to the Bantu language family.

According to Malcolm Guthrie, Kikongo is in the language group H10, the Kongo languages. Other languages in the same group include Bembe (H11). Ethnologue 16 counts Ndingi (H14) and Mboka (H15) as dialects of Kongo, though it acknowledges they may be distinct languages.

According to Bastin, Coupez and Man's classification (Tervuren) which is more recent and precise than that of Guthrie on Kikongo, the language has the following dialects:

Kikongo group H16
Southern Kikongo H16a
Central Kikongo H16b
Yombe (also called Kiyombe) H16c
Fiote H16d
Western Kikongo H16d
Bwende H16e
Lari H16f
Eastern Kikongo H16g
Southeastern Kikongo H16h

NB: Kisikongo is not the protolanguage of the Kongo language cluster. Not all varieties of Kikongo are mutually intelligible (for example, 1. Civili is better understood by Kiyombe- and Iwoyo-speakers than by Kisikongo- or Kimanianga-speakers; 2. Kimanianga is better understood by Kikongo of Boko and Kintandu-speakers than by Civili or Iwoyo-speakers).

Phonology 

 The phoneme  can occur, but is rarely used.
There is contrastive vowel length. /m/ and /n/ also have syllabic variants, which contrast with prenasalized consonants.

Grammar

Noun classes 
Kikongo has a system of 18 noun classes in which nouns are classified according to noun prefixes. Most of the classes go in pairs (singular and plural) except for the locative and infinitive classes which do not admit plurals.            

 

NB: Noun prefixes may or may not change from one Kikongo variant to another (e.g. class 7: the noun prefix ci  is used in civili, iwoyo or ciladi (lari) and the noun prefix ki is used in kisikongo, kiyombe, kizombo, kimanianga,…).

Conjugation 

NB: Not all variants of Kikongo have completely the same personal pronouns and when conjugating verbs, the  personal pronouns become stressed pronouns (see below and/or the references posted).

Conjugating the verb (mpanga in Kikongo) to be (kuena or kuwena; also kuba or kukala in Kikongo) in the present:

Conjugating the verb (mpanga in Kikongo) to have (kuvua in Kikongo; also kuba na or  kukala ye) in the present :

NB: In Kikongo, the conjugation of a tense to different persons is done by changing verbal prefixes (highlighted in bold). These verbal prefixes are also personal pronouns. However, not all variants of Kikongo have completely the same verbal prefixes and the same verbs (cf. the references posted). The ksludotique site uses several variants of Kikongo (kimanianga,...).

Vocabulary

English words of Kongo origin 
 The Southern American English word "goober", meaning peanut, comes from Kongo nguba.
 The word zombie
 The word funk, or funky, in American popular music has its origin, some say, in the Kongo word Lu-fuki.
 The name of the Cuban dance mambo comes from a Bantu word meaning "conversation with the gods".
In addition, the roller coaster Kumba at Busch Gardens Tampa Bay in Tampa, Florida gets its name from the Kongo word for "roar".
 The word chimpanzee

Sample text
According to Filomão CUBOLA, article 1 of the Universal Declaration of Human Rights in Fiote translates to: 
Bizingi bioso bisiwu ti batu bambutukanga mu kidedi ki buzitu ayi kibumswa. Bizingi-bene, batu, badi diela ayi tsi-ntima, bafwene kuzingila mbatzi-na-mbatzi-yandi mu mtima bukhomba.
"All human beings are born free and equal in dignity and rights. They are endowed with reason and conscience and should act towards one another in a spirit of brotherhood."

References

External links 

OLAC resources in and about the Koongo language

Kongo learning materials 
Cours de KIKONGO (1955) (French and Kongo language) par Léon DEREAU.  Maison d'éditions AD. WESMAEL-CHARLIER, Namur; 117 pages.
Leçons de Kikongo par des Bakongo (1964) Eengenhoven - Louvain. Grammaire et Vocabulaire. 62 pages.
KIKONGO, Notions grammaticales, Vocabulaire Français – Kikongo – Néerlandais - Latin (1960) par A. Coene, Imprimerie Mission Catholique Tumba. 102 pages.
 (1957) par Léon DEREAU, d'après le dictionnaire de K. E. LAMAN. Maison d'éditions AD. WESMAEL-CHARLIER, Namur. 60 pages.
 Carter, Hazel and João Makoondekwa. , c1987. Kongo language course : a course in the dialect of Zoombo, northern Angola = Maloòngi makíkoongo. Madison, WI : African Studies Program, University of Wisconsin—Madison.
Nominalisations en Kisikóngó (H16): les substantifs prédicatifs et les verbes-supports vánga, sala, sá et tá (faire) (2015). Luntadila Nlandu Inocente.
Grammaire du Kiyombe par R. P. L. DE CLERCQ. Edition Goemaere - Bruxelles - Kinshasa. 47 pages
Nkutama a Mvila za Makanda, Imprimerie Mission Catholique Tumba, (1934) par J. CUVELIER, Vic. Apostlique de Matadi. 56 pages (L'auteur est en réalité Mwene Petelo BOKA, Catechiste redemptoriste à Vungu, originaire de Kionzo.)
Dictionary and Grammar of the Kongo Language (1886) Bentley, William Holman. 718 pages.
Learn basic Kikongo (Mofeko) Omotola Akindipe and Moisés Kudimuena.